Captain John Norwood VC (8 September 1876 – 8 September 1914) was an English recipient of the Victoria Cross, the highest and most prestigious award for gallantry in the face of the enemy that can be awarded to British and Commonwealth forces. He was educated at Exeter College, Oxford.

Early military career
Norwood was commissioned a second lieutenant in the 5th (Princess Charlotte of Wales's) Dragoon Guards on 8 February 1899.

Victoria Cross details
Norwood was 23 years old, and a second lieutenant in the 5th Dragoon Guards (Princess Charlotte of Wales's), British Army during the Second Boer War when the following deed took place at Ladysmith for which he was awarded the VC:

He served in Transvaal and the Orange River Colony, and was promoted to lieutenant on 27 June 1900. He stayed with the Guards regiment in South Africa until the war ended in May 1902, and left for Calcutta on the SS Umlazi two months later.

Later military career
Norwood later achieved the rank of captain. He served in the First World War and was killed in action during the First Battle of the Marne at Sablonnieres, France, on 8 September 1914.

Memorial
A brass memorial to him can be seen in St Michael's Church, East Peckham, Kent

His name is inscribed on a large plaque in Exeter College chapel, which is in remembrance of all those former members of the college who fell in the Great War.

His VC is on display at the Lord Ashcroft Gallery in the Imperial War Museum, London.

References

Monuments to Courage (David Harvey, 1999)
The Register of the Victoria Cross (This England, 1997)
Victoria Crosses of the Anglo-Boer War (Ian Uys, 2000)

External links
 
 Angloboerwar.com

1876 births
1914 deaths
British Army personnel of World War I
British Army personnel of the Second Boer War
British military personnel killed in World War I
5th Dragoon Guards officers
British recipients of the Victoria Cross
Second Boer War recipients of the Victoria Cross
People from Beckenham
People educated at Rugby School
British Army recipients of the Victoria Cross